James Joseph Tarbuck  (born 6 February 1940) is an English comedian, singer, actor, entertainer and game show host.

He was a host of Sunday Night at the London Palladium in the mid-1960s, and hosted numerous game shows and quiz shows on ITV during the 1970s, 1980s and early 1990s. He is also known for leading ITV's Live From Her Majesty's and its subsequent incarnations during the 1980s.

Actress and television and radio presenter Liza Tarbuck is his daughter.

Biography
Tarbuck was born in Wavertree, Liverpool, on 6 February 1940.  He has an older brother (William) and his parents, Ada McLoughlin (aka Ada Hannagan) and Joseph Frederick Tarbuck, married in March 1947.

He attended Dovedale Primary School in Liverpool, where he was a schoolmate of John Lennon. In April 1960, at the age of 20, he was convicted of stealing a diamond-encrusted cigarette holder from the dressing room of comedian Terry-Thomas, and was placed on probation for two years.

His first television show was It's Tarbuck '65! on ITV in 1964, though he had been introduced on Sunday Night at the London Palladium in October 1963 by Bruce Forsyth. He then replaced Forsyth as the last original host of the show from 1965 until it was axed in 1967. He has also hosted numerous quiz shows, including Winner Takes All, Full Swing, and Tarby's Frame Game. In the early 1970s he hosted a variety show Tarbuck's Luck on the BBC.

In the 1980s, he hosted similar Sunday night variety shows, Live from Her Majesty's, Live from the Piccadilly and finally Live from the Palladium, which were produced by London Weekend Television for ITV.

He appeared on the fourth series of BBC One's Strictly Come Dancing in 2006, but was forced to pull out due to high blood pressure, and needed surgery to fit stents in his heart. In 2008, he returned to a variety format on television screens when he co-hosted, alongside Emma Bunton, an edition of ITV1's variety show For One Night Only. He appeared on Piers Morgan's Life Stories on 25 May 2012, while on 3 December that year he was invited to celebrate 100 years of the Royal Variety Performance along with Bruce Forsyth, Ronnie Corbett and Des O'Connor.

Tarbuck made a Comedy Playhouse pilot for the BBC in 1967, acting in Johnny Speight's To Lucifer, A Son alongside John Le Mesurier and Pat Coombs, but a series was not commissioned. His only other acting credit was in a 1993 episode of police comedy The Detectives, playing the straight role of Johnny McKenna, an international arms dealer who liked to conduct his business on the golf course.

In October 2015, Tarbuck and Des O'Connor starred in their own one-off show at the London Palladium to raise money for the new Royal Variety Charity. During the following two years they toured clubs and theatres around the UK with his comedy show, and sometimes as a double act with Kenny Lynch.

Personal life
Tarbuck married Pauline (née Carfoot) in 1959. His best man was footballer Bobby Campbell. The couple live in Coombe, Kingston upon Thames, London, and have three children: Cheryl (born in 1960), Liza (born in 1964), and James (born in 1968).

Tarbuck has often been nicknamed 'Tarby'. He is a Conservative Party supporter, and at the height of his celebrity was a prominent supporter of Margaret Thatcher and her policies, baking her a cake to celebrate her 60th birthday in October 1985.

Tarbuck is well-known as a keen player of golf, and was prominent as a competitor in pro-celebrity golf matches when these were televised.

In February 2020, Tarbuck revealed that, the day after his 80th birthday, he had been diagnosed with prostate cancer.

Discography

Albums
Jimmy Tarbuck (RCA Victor, 1968)
Having a Party (Wonderful, 1980, Jimmy Tarbuck & Kenny Lynch)
Jimmy Tarbuck (Clam Records)

Singles and EPs
"Someday" / "Wastin' Time" (Immediate, 1965)		
"Stewball" / "When My Little Girl Is Smiling" (Philips, 1967)
"Doctor Dolittle" (Parlophone, 1967)
"Your Cheatin' Heart" (Parlophone, 1968)
"There's No Such Thing as Love" (RCA Victor, 1968)
"You Wanted Someone to Play With" (RCA Victor, 1969)	
"Lucky Jim" / "Run to Him" (Bell, 1972)
"Follow the Fairway" / "Lee Trevino" (EMI, 1976)†	
"Let's Have a Party" (Laser, 1979, with Kenny Lynch)		
"Let's Have a Party" (Towerbell, 1982, EP with Kenny Lynch)	
"Again" (Safari, 1985)

†Credited to 'The Caddies' (Henry Cooper, Tony Dalli, Bruce Forsyth, Kenny Lynch, Glen Mason, Ed Stewart, Jimmy Tarbuck)

References

External links
 

1940 births
Living people
20th-century English comedians
21st-century English comedians
Butlins Redcoats
Comedians from Liverpool
Conservative Party (UK) people
English game show hosts
English male singers
English radio presenters
English stand-up comedians
Officers of the Order of the British Empire
Television presenters from Liverpool